Parafield may refer to:

A suburb of Adelaide, South Australia:
Parafield, South Australia
Parafield Gardens, South Australia

A railway station in Adelaide, South Australia:
Parafield railway station
Parafield Gardens railway station

An airport in Adelaide, South Australia:
Parafield Airport